The 14th Legislature of the Third Portuguese Republic is the current meeting of the Assembly of the Republic, the legislative body of Portugal, with the membership determined by the results of the legislative election held on 6 October 2019. The Assembly of the Republic met for the first time on 25 October 2019. On 4 December 2021 the President of the Republic dissolved the 14th Legislature and called for a snap election on 30 January 2022.

Election
The 2019 Portuguese legislative election was held on 6 October 2019. At the election, the Socialist Party (PS) became the largest party in the Assembly of the Republic but fell short of a majority.

References

2019 establishments in Portugal
Assembly of the Republic (Portugal)
2021 disestablishments in Portugal